The Doha Industrial Area is a district of Doha Municipality, Qatar. It was previously a part of the Al Rayyan Municipality, which now geographically separates it from rest of Doha Municipality. The majority of the area's workers reside in adjacent Labour City. 

A municipal office for Doha Municipality is found in the district.

Asian Town
Asian Town is a major commercial complex in the Industrial Area. Formerly known as West End Park, it contains many amenities for the district, such as West End Park International Cricket Stadium, an amphitheater, a large shopping mall and three cinema halls. It was built to cater towards the large Asian expatriate population from South Asia and Southeast Asia in Qatar, particularly the Indian, Bangladeshi Pakistani, Nepali and Filipino communities.

Healthcare
Hazm Mebaireek General Hospital, centrally located in the district, received its first outpatients in September 2018. In December 2018, the hospital was officially opened to the public.

Public Transport

Bus
Mowasalat is the official transport company in Qatar and serves the community through its operation of public bus routes. As the most populous area located outside of downtown Doha, the Industrial Area is served by six bus lines, four of which depart from Al Ghanim Bus Station and two of which depart at the Karwa Bus Station. Furthermore, there is a bus station in Asian Town which serves as the station of departure for six daily routes.

 Al Ghanim Bus Station departures (all routes from this station terminate at Street 1 in the Industrial Area) 
 Route 32 
 Stops at Al Sadd and Villaggio Mall 
 Runs every 20 minutes 
 Route 33
 Stops at Salwa Road
 Runs every 20 minutes
 Route 33A
 Stops at Salwa Road and Ain Khaled
 Runs every 30 minutes
 Route 33C 
 Stops at Salwa Road and the Criminal Evidences and Information Department (CEID)
 Runs every 30 minutes
 Karwa Bus Station departures (circular routes)
 Routes 61 and 81 are identical
 Stop in the Industrial Area on Street 52
 Run every 30 minutes

Rail 
The elevated Industrial Area Metro Station is under construction, having been launched during Phase 1A. Once completed, it will be part of Doha Metro's Green Line.

Demographics
As of the 2010 census, the district comprised 29,001 housing units and 4,395 establishments. There were 261,401 people living in the district, of which 99.9% were male and 0.1% were female. Out of the 261,401 inhabitants, 99% were 20 years of age or older and 1% were under the age of 20.

Employed persons made up 99.8% of the total population. Females accounted for 0% of the working population.

References

Communities in Doha